Ethnic cleansing occurred during the Bosnian War (1992–95) as large numbers of Bosnian Muslims (Bosniaks) and Bosnian Croats were forced to flee their homes or were expelled by the Army of Republika Srpska and Serb paramilitaries. Bosniaks and Bosnian Serbs had also been forced to flee or were expelled by Bosnian Croat forces, though on a restricted scale and in lesser numbers. The UN Security Council Final Report (1994) states while Bosniaks also engaged in "grave breaches of the Geneva Conventions and other violations of international humanitarian law", they "have not engaged in "systematic ethnic cleansing"". According to the report, "there is no factual basis for arguing that there is a 'moral equivalence' between the warring factions".

Beginning in 1991, political upheavals in Bosnia and Herzegovina displaced about 2.7 million people by mid-1992, of which over 700,000 sought asylum in other European countries, making it the largest exodus in Europe since World War II. It is estimated between 1.0 and 1.3 million people were uprooted in these ethnic cleansing campaigns, and that tens of thousands were killed.

The methods used during the Bosnian ethnic cleansing campaigns include "killing of civilians, rape, torture, destruction of civilian, public, and cultural property, looting and pillaging, and the forcible relocation of civilian populations". Most of the perpetrators of these campaigns were Serb forces and most of the victims were Bosniaks. The UN-backed International Criminal Tribunal for the former Yugoslavia (ICTY) later convicted several officials for persecution on political, racial and religious grounds; forced transfer and deportation constituting a crime against humanity. The Srebrenica massacre, which was also included as part of the ethnic cleansing campaign, was found to constitute the crime of genocide.

Historical background

Kingdom of Bosnia was annexed by the Ottoman Empire from 1463 until 1878. During this period, large parts of its population, mostly Bosniaks (Bosnian Muslims), converted to Islam, giving its society its multiethnic character. Bosnia and Herzegovina's ethnic groups—the Bosniaks, Bosnian Serbs and Bosnian Croats—lived peacefully together from 1878 until the outbreak of World War I in 1914, before which intermittent tensions between the three groups were mostly the result of economic issues, though Serbia had had territorial pretensions towards Bosnia and Herzegovina at least since 1878. According to some historians, certain Serb and Croat nationalists, who practiced Orthodox and Catholic Christianity, respectively, never accepted Bosniaks as a nationality and tried to assimilate them into their own cultures. World War II lead to interethnic clashes, though the three groups were evenly split between various factions and did not rally universally along the ethnic lines. After World War II, Bosnia and Herzegovina became part of the Socialist Federative Republic of Yugoslavia.

After the death of its leader Josip Broz Tito, Yugoslavia experienced a dysfunctional political system and economic calamity in the 1980s. As communism was losing its potency, new nationalist leaders Slobodan Milošević in Serbia and Franjo Tuđman in Croatia came to power. Slovenia and Croatia called for reforms and a looser confederation of the state in Yugoslavia but this call was opposed by the country's government in Belgrade. On 25  June 1991, Slovenia and Croatia declared independence from Yugoslavia. A short armed conflict followed in Slovenia and the Croatian War of Independence escalated. Macedonia also declared independence, which Yugoslavia granted without conflict. The RAM Plan began to be implemented, laying the foundations for new borders of a "Third Yugoslavia" in an effort to establish a country where "all Serbs with their territories would live together in the same state".

The Izetbegović-Gligorov Plan offered a restructuring of Yugoslavia based on the principle 2+2+2, with Serbia and Montenegro as the core of an asymmetric federation, with Bosnia and Macedonia in a loose federation, and with Croatia and Slovenia in an even looser confederation. The plan was not accepted by either side. In late 1991, the Serbs began establishing autonomous regions in Bosnia. When the Party of Democratic Action's (SDA) representatives in the Parliament of the Republic of Bosnia and Herzegovina announced their plan for a referendum on independence from Yugoslavia on 14 October 1991, leading Bosnian Serb politician Radovan Karadžić, of the Serb Democratic Party (SDS), made a speech at the parliamentary session and publicly threatened war and the extinction of the Bosniaks as a people. On 9 January 1992, the Bosnian Serb Assembly proclaimed the "Republic of Serbian people of Bosnia and Herzegovina", which would include territory with a Serb majority and "additional territories, not precisely identified but to include areas where the Serbs had been in a majority" before World War II.

On 29 February and 1 March 1992, Bosnia and Herzegovina held an independence referendum, after which it declared independence from Yugoslavia. Most Bosnian Serbs wanted to remain in the same state with Serbia. During the 16th session of the Bosnian Serb Assembly on 12 May 1992, Karadžić, who was by then the leader of the self-proclaimed Republika Srpska proto-state, presented his "six strategic goals", which included the "separation from the other two national communities and the separation of states", and the "creation of a corridor in the Drina Valley thus eliminating the Drina [River] as a border between Serbian states". Republika Srpska General Ratko Mladić identified "Muslims and Croat hordes" as the enemy and suggested to the Assembly it must decide whether to throw them out by political means or through force.

The Bosnian War quickly escalated. Serb forces were composed of the Army of Republika Srpska (VRS), the Yugoslav People's Army (JNA) and Serbian and Bosnian Serb paramilitary forces. Their aim was to form either a rump Yugoslavia or a Greater Serbia. The Serb authorities in Belgrade wanted to annex new territories for Serbs in Bosnia and Croatia that would eventually be added to Serbia and Montenegro.

At the start of the war, Bosniak forces that were organized in the Army of the Republic of Bosnia and Herzegovina (ARBiH), and Croat forces that were organized in the Croatian Defence Council (HVO), initially cooperated against the Yugoslav People's Army (JNA) and the Army of Republika Srpska (Bosnian Serb Army or VRS). The Croatian Defence Council (HVO) was the official army of the Croatian Republic of Herzeg-Bosnia (HR HB), a separate "political, cultural, economic and territorial entity" within Bosnia proclaimed by Mate Boban on 18 November 1991. The HVO said it had no secessionary goal and vowed to respect the central government in Sarajevo. The HR HB was financed and armed by Croatia. International officials and the International Criminal Tribunal for the Former Yugoslavia (ICTY) concluded that the aim of the establishment of HR HB was to form a Greater Croatia from parts of Bosnia and Herzegovina, in effect partitioning Bosnia and Herzegovina between an expanded Serbia and Croatia.

Definitions

Ethnic cleansing is a purposeful policy of "rendering an area ethnically homogeneous by using force or intimidation to remove from a given area persons from another ethnic group".

A report by the UN Commission of Experts dated 27 May 1994 defined ethnic cleansing as an act of "rendering an area ethnically homogenous by using force or
intimidation to remove persons of given groups from the area", and found that ethnic cleansing has been carried out through "murder, torture, arbitrary arrest and detention, extra-judicial executions, rape and sexual assaults, confinement of civilian populations in ghetto areas, forcible removal, displacement and deportation of civilian populations, deliberate military attacks or threats of attacks on civilians and civilian areas, and wanton destruction of property". Such forms of persecution of a group were defined as crimes against humanity and they can also fall within the meaning of the Genocide Convention.

The terms "ethnic cleansing" and "genocide" are not synonymous but academic discourse considers both to exist within a spectrum of assaults on nations or religio-ethnic groups. Ethnic cleansing is similar to the forced deportation or population transfer of a group to change the ethnic composition of a territory whereas genocide is aimed at the destruction of a group. To draw a distinction between the terms, the International Court of Justice (ICJ) delivered a verdict in the Bosnian Genocide Case:
It [i.e. ethnic cleansing] can only be a form of genocide within the meaning of the [Genocide] Convention, if it corresponds to or falls within one of the categories of acts prohibited by Article II of the Convention. Neither the intent, as a matter of policy, to render an area "ethnically homogeneous", nor the operations that may be carried out to implement such policy, can as such be designated as genocide: the intent that characterizes genocide is "to destroy, in whole or in part" a particular group, and deportation or displacement of the members of a group, even if effected by force, is not necessarily equivalent to destruction of that group, nor is such destruction an automatic consequence of the displacement. This is not to say that acts described as 'ethnic cleansing' may never constitute genocide, if they are such as to be characterized as, for example, 'deliberately inflicting on the group conditions of life calculated to bring about its physical destruction in whole or in part', contrary to Article II, paragraph (c), of the Convention, provided such action is carried out with the necessary specific intent (dolus specialis), that is to say with a view to the destruction of the group, as distinct from its removal from the region. — ICJ.

International reports
The United States Senate Committee on Foreign Relations published a staff report on the ethnic cleansing in Bosnia in August 1992. On 17 November the same year, United Nations special rapporteur Tadeusz Mazowiecki issued a report titled "Situation of Human Rights in the Territory of the Former Yugoslavia" to the United Nations (UN). In the report, the ethnic cleansing in Bosnia and Herzegovina was singled out and described as a political objective of Serb nationalists who wanted to ensure control of territories with a Serb majority as well as "adjacent territories assimilated to them". Paramilitaries played a major role in ethnic cleansing, according to the report.

On 18 December 1992, the United Nations General Assembly issued resolution 47/147, in which it rejected the "acquisition of territory by force" and condemned "in the strongest possible terms the abhorrent practice of 'ethnic cleansing'", and recognised "the Serbian leadership in territories under their control in Bosnia and Herzegovina, the Yugoslav Army and the political leadership of the Republic of Serbia bear primary responsibility for this reprehensible practice".

On 1 January 1993, Helsinki Watch released a report on the conflicts in the former Yugoslavia. It found ethnic cleansing was "the most egregious violations in both Croatia and Bosnia-Hercegovina" because it envisaged "summary execution, disappearance, arbitrary detention, deportation and forcible displacement of hundreds of thousands of people on the basis of their religion or nationality".

United Nations Security Council Resolution 780 authorised the establishment of a Commission of Experts to record the crimes in the former Yugoslavia, including Bosnia and Herzegovina. On 27 May 1994, these reports, which described the policy of ethnic cleansing, were concluded. The United States Senate Committee on Foreign Relations held a hearing on war crimes in the Balkans on 9 August 1995.

On 15 November 1999, the UN released its "Report of the Secretary-General pursuant to General Assembly resolution 53/35: The fall of Srebrenica [A/54/549]", which details the fall of Srebrenica in July 1995 and found it was part of the larger Serb ethnic cleansing plan to depopulate Bosnian territories they wanted to annex so Serbs could repopulate them.

Campaigns and methods
The methods used during the Bosnian ethnic cleansing campaigns included "killing of civilians, rape, torture, destruction of civilian, public, and cultural property, looting and pillaging, and the forcible relocation of civilian populations". They also included administrative measures, such as one ethnic group losing their jobs, experiencing discrimination or denial of hospital treatment. The forcible displacement of civilian populations was a consequence of the conflict and its objective through the ethnic cleansing campaign. The Serb campaign included selective murder of civic, religious and intellectual representatives of Bosniaks and Croats; the sending of adult males into concentration camps and the rape of women. The Serb campaign also included the destruction and burning of Croat and Bosniak historical, religious and cultural sites.

Serb forces

Between 700,000 and a 1,000,000 Bosniaks were expelled from their homes from the Bosnian territory held by the Serb forces. Another source estimates that at least 750,000 Bosniaks and a smaller number of Croats were expulsed from these areas. Additionally, around 30,000 Romani were also ousted. Methods used to achieve this included coercion and terror in order to pressure Bosniaks, Croats and others into leaving Serb-claimed areas.

The initial Constitution of Republika Srpska in Article I.1 declared that it was "the state of the Serb people", without any mention of other ethnic groups living there. Numerous discriminatory measures were introduced against Bosniaks on VRS-held territory. In the town of Prijedor, starting from 30 April 1992, non-Serbs were dismissed from their jobs and banned from entering the court building, and were replaced by Serbs. Bosniak intellectuals and others were deported to the Omarska camp. Bosniak and Croat homes were searched for weapons and were sometimes looted. On 31 May 1992, an order stipulated that non-Serbs have to mark their houses with white flags or sheets, or to wear white armbands outside their homes. Serb forces accompanied non-Serbs wearing white armbands to buses that transported them to camps at Omarska, Trnopolje  and Keraterm camp. Movement was restricted through a curfew and checkpoints. Radio broadcasts appealed to Serbs to "lynch" Bosniaks and Croats. Torture and mistreatment in these detention centres were established as to leave inmates with no other choice then to accept the offer of their release under the condition they sign a document that compelled them to leave the area.

In Banja Luka, Bosniaks and Croats were evicted from their homes, and incoming displaced Serbs took their accommodation. Forced labour imposed by the authorities hastened the flight of non-Serbs. Those leaving Banja Luka had to sign documents of abandonment of their properties without compensation. Paramilitaries frequently broke into the homes of non-Serbs at night to rob and assault the occupants. In some instances, paramilitaries would shoot at the houses. The local Serb police did not prevent these sustained assaults. In Zvornik, Bosniaks were given official stamps on identity cards for a change of domicile; to leave the area, they were forced to transfer their properties to an agency for the exchange of houses. Starting from May–June 1992, Bosniaks were taken by bus to Tuzla and Subotica in Serbia. Some residents were ordered to leave at gunpoint. Similar forced removals occurred in Foča, Vlasenica, Brčko, Bosanski Šamac, and other Bosnian towns. In the villages around Vlasenica, the Serb Special Police Platoon was ordered by Miroslav Kraljević that the territory has to be "100 % clean" and that no Bosniak should remain. UNHCR representatives were reluctant to help Bosniaks leave war-affected areas, fearing they would become unwilling accomplices to the ethnic cleansing. Foča was renamed Srbinje (The Place of the Serbs). One Bosniak woman, who was raped, said her rapist  told her his aim was to baptise and convert all of them to Serbs.

In Kozluk in June 1992, Bosniaks were rounded up and placed in trucks and trains to remove them from the area. In Bijeljina, non-Serbs were also evicted from their homes and dismissed from their jobs. Arrested non-Serbs were sent to the Batković camp, where they performed forced labor on the front lines. Serb paramilitary singled out Bosniaks and used violence against them. In the Višegrad massacres  of 1992, hundreds of Bosniaks were rounded up on a bridge, shot and thrown into the river or locked in houses and burnt alive; Bosniak women were raped and a Bosniak man was tied to a car and dragged around the town. 70% of all expulsions occurred between April and August 1992, when the Serb forces attacked 37 municipalities across Bosnia, reducing the non-Serb population from 726,960 (54%) in 1991 to 235,015 (36%) in 1997. 850 Bosniak and Croat villages were razed to the ground.

The VRS placed Bosniak enclaves under siege. After the VRS takeover of Srebrenica on 11 July 1995, 7,475 Bosniaks were massacred while a further 23,000 people were bused out of the area by 13 July. Overall, the Serb forces killed approximately 50,000 non-Serbs across Bosnia in order to force many others into leaving.

Croat forces

In early 1992, as VRS forces were advancing towards Odžak and Bosanska Posavina, Croat forces routed Serb civilians living in the area and transported them to Croatia. They also expelled Serbs from Herzegovina and burned their houses in May 1992. In 1993, the Bosnian Croat authorities used ethnic cleansing in conjunction with the attack on Mostar, where Bosniaks were placed in Croat-run detention camps. Croat forces evicted Bosniaks from the western part of Mostar and from other towns and villages, including Stolac and Čapljina. To assume power in communities in Central Bosnia and Western Herzegovina that were coveted by the HR BH, its president Mate Boban ordered the Croatian Defence Council (HVO) to start persecuting Bosniaks living in these territories. Croat forces used "artillery, eviction, violence, rape, robbery and extortion" to expel or kill the Bosniak population, some of whom were detained in the Heliodrom and Dretelj camps. The Ahmići and Stupni Do massacres had the aim of removing Bosniaks from these areas.

Croat soldiers blew up Bosniak businesses and shops in some towns. They arrested thousands of Bosniak civilians and tried to remove them from Herzegovina by deporting them to third countries. HR HB forces purged Serbs and Bosniaks from government offices and the police. The Bosniaks of HR HB-designated areas were increasingly harassed. In Vitez and Zenica in April 1993, Croat soldiers warned Bosniaks they would be killed in three hours unless they left their homes. 5,000 Bosniaks were expelled from the Vitez region and 20,000–25,000 from the Croat-controlled part of Mostar. Similar events occurred in Prozor, where Bosniaks left after Croat forces took over the city, looting and burning Bosniak shops.

Bosniak forces
According to the UN Security Council's "Final Report (1994)", Bosniaks engaged in "grave breaches of the Geneva Conventions and other violations of international humanitarian law" but they did not engage in "systematic ethnic cleansing". Bosnian prosecutors charged former members of the Bosnian Army with crimes against humanity against Serbs, with the aim of expelling them from Konjic and surrounding villages in May 1992. During the 1993 siege of Goražde, Bosniak forces expelled some Serbs from the town and placed others under house arrest. Similar incidents occurred in March 1993 when Bosniak authorities initiated a campaign to expel Croats from Konjic. Thousands of Croat civilians were also expelled from Bugojno in 1993 and 1994 by the Army of the Republic of Bosnia and Herzegovina. During the siege of Sarajevo, Bosniak paramilitary leader Mušan Topalović and his forces abducted and killed mostly Serbs living in and around the Sarajevo suburb Bistrik before Bosnian police killed Topalović in October 1993. After the war, Croats left Vareš voluntarily, fearing Bosniak revenge. The departure of Croats from Sarajevo, Tuzla and Zenica had different motives, which were not always the direct consequence of pressure by Bosniaks.

Demographic changes

According to the 1991 census, Bosnia and Herzegovina had a population of 4,364,574, of whom 43.7% were Bosniaks, 31.4% were Serbs, 17.3% were Croats and 5.5% were Yugoslavs. In 1981, around 16% of the population were of mixed ancestry. Serbs comprised 31% of Bosnia and Herzegovina's populace but Karadžić claimed 70% of the country's territory. The organizers of the ethnic cleansing campaign wanted to replace Bosnia's multiethnic society with a society based on Serb nationalist supremacy, which was seen as a form of Serbianisation of these areas. Indian academic Radha Kumar described such territorial separation of groups based on their nationality as "ethnic apartheid".

It is estimated between 1.0 and 1.3 million people were uprooted and that tens of thousands were killed during the ethnic cleansing. Serb forces perpetrated most of the ethnic cleansing campaigns and the majority of the victims were Bosniaks. 

In September 1994, UNHCR representatives estimated  around 80,000 non-Serbs out of 837,000 who initially lived on the Serb-controlled territory of Bosnia and Herzegovina before the war remained there; an estimated removal of 90% of the Bosniak and Croat inhabitants of Serb-coveted territory, almost all of whom were deliberately forced out of their homes. By the end of the war in late 1995, the Bosnian Serb forces had expelled or killed 95% of all non-Serbs living in the territory they annexed. In one municipality, Zvornik, the Bosniak and Croat population dropped from 31,000 in 1991 to less than 1,000 in 1997.

Before the war, the Bosnian territory held by the Army of the Republika Srpska was comprised out of 47% Serbs, 33% Bosniaks and 13% Croats. After the war, according to a research by Bosnian demographer Murat Prašo, in 1995 Serbs comprised 89%, while Bosniaks made 3% and Croats 1% of the remaining population. In the Bosnian territory held by the HVO and the Croatian Army, before the war, Croats comprised 49% of the population; this percentage rose to 96% in 1996. By the same year, the percentage of Bosniaks fell from 22% to 2.5% and the percentage of Serbs fell from 25% to 0.3%.
Before the war, Bosniaks comprised 57% of the populace of territory controlled by the Bosnian government; at the end of the war, they comprised 74%.

Croatian historian Saša Mrduljaš analysed the demographic changes based on the territorial control following the Dayton Agreement. According to his research, in Republika Srpska, the number of Bosniaks changed from 473,000 in 1991 to 100,000 in 2011, the number of Croats from 151,000 to 15,000, and the number of Serbs changed from 886,000 to 1,220,000. In the territory controlled by the ARBiH, the number of Serbs changed from 400,000 to 50,000, the number of Croats changed from 243,000 to 110,000, and the number of Bosniaks changed from 1,323,000 to 1,550,000. In the HVO-held area, the number of Serbs changed from 80,000 to 20,000, the number of Bosniaks changed from 107,000 to 70,000, and the number of Croats changed 367,000 in 1991 to 370,000 in 2011.

Initial estimates placed the number of refugees and internally displaced people during the Bosnian War at 2.7 million, though later publications by the UN cite 2.2 million people who fled or were forced from their homes. It was the largest exodus in Europe since World War II. A million people were internally displaced and 1.2 million people left the country; 685,000 fled to western Europe—330,000 of whom went to Germany—and 446,500 went to other former Yugoslav republics. The Bosnian War ended when the Dayton Agreement was signed on 14 December 1995; it stipulated Bosnia and Herzegovina was to stay a united country shared by Federation of Bosnia and Herzegovina (FBiH) and Republika Srpska, and granted the right of return for victims of ethnic cleansing.

The homogenization of the population continued after the war finished. When the Serb-held areas of Sarajevo were transferred to the FBiH in March 1996, many Serbs left Sarajevo in the ensuing months. Between 60,000 and 90,000 Serbs left Sarajevo's suburbs. This was interpreted as a result of Dayton's division of Bosnia along ethnic lines. The Bosnian Serbs' politicians pressured Serbs into leaving Sarajevo while the mixed statements of the Bosnian government caused a lack of confidence among Serb inhabitants. Bosnian Serb extremists burned apartments and expelled Serbs who wanted to stay in these suburbs before the handover to the Bosnian government. In Ilidža, medicine, machines and utility equipment disappeared. Serb politician Momčilo Krajišnik publicly called for Serbs to leave Sarajevo, which prompted a UN press officer to call the Serb authorities "the masters of manipulation". This episode is often cited as "difficult to distinguish between coercion and voluntarism".

The demographic changes caused by the conflict in Bosnia and Herzegovina were the most dramatic that country had experienced in a century; the 2013 population census registered 3,531,159 inhabitants—a more-than-19% decline within a single generation.

Destruction of religious buildings

Islamic

Orthodox

Catholic
In 1998, Bosnian bishops reported 269 Catholic churches had been destroyed in the Bosnian War.

Destruction of housing units
Around 500,000 of the 1,295,000 housing units in Bosnia were either damaged or destroyed; 50% were damaged and 6% destroyed in FBiH while 24% were damaged and 5% destroyed in RS. Some of the destruction was incidental damage from combat but most of the extensive destruction and plunder was part of a deliberate plan of ethnic cleansing that was aimed at preventing expelled people from returning to their homes. Half of the schools and a third of the hospitals in the country were also damaged or destroyed.

Legal prosecution and war crimes trials

Several people were tried and convicted by the UN-backed International Criminal Tribunal for the former Yugoslavia (ICTY) in connection with persecution on racial, religious or ethnic grounds, forced displacement and deportation as a crime against humanity during the Bosnian War. The Srebrenica massacre, which was also included as part of the ethnic cleansing campaign, was found to constitute a crime of genocide.

Those convicted for taking part in the ethnic cleansing campaigns in Bosnia and Herzegovina include Bosnian Serb politicians, soldiers and officials Momčilo Krajišnik, Radoslav Brđanin, Stojan Župljanin, Mićo Stanišić, Biljana Plavšić, Goran Jelisić, Miroslav Deronjić, Zoran Žigić, Blagoje Simić, Jovica Stanišić, Franko Simatović, Radovan Karadžić and Ratko Mladić. They also include Bosnian Croat officials Mladen Naletilić, Dario Kordić, Slobodan Praljak, Bruno Stojić and Jadranko Prlić.

In its verdict against Karadžić, the ICTY found there was a joint criminal enterprise that aimed to forcibly resettle non-Serbs from large parts of Bosnia, and that it existed from October 1991:

In the judgement against Bosnian Croat leader Dario Kordić, the ICTY found there was a plan to remove Bosniaks from Croat-claimed territory:

See also
 Bosnian genocide
 Bosnian genocide case
 Territorial nationalism

Footnotes

References

Bibliography

Books

Scientific journals

Other sources
 
 
 
 
 
 
 
 

1992 in Bosnia and Herzegovina
1993 in Bosnia and Herzegovina
1994 in Bosnia and Herzegovina
1995 in Bosnia and Herzegovina
 
Croatian nationalism in Bosnia and Herzegovina
Serbian nationalism in Bosnia and Herzegovina
 
 
Bos